Thirakhupt's bent-toed gecko (Cyrtodactylus thirakhupti) is a species of gecko, a lizard in the family Gekkonidae. The species is endemic to Thailand.

Etymology
The specific name, thirakhupti, is in honor of Thai herpetologist Kumthorn Thirakhupt.

Geographic range
C. thirakhupti is found in southern Thailand.

Type locality: Tham Khao Sonk [= Cave of Sonk Mountain], Thachana District, Surat Thani Province.

Habitat
The preferred natural habitat of C. thirakhupti is caves.

Description

Reproduction
C. thirakhupti is oviparous.

References

Further reading
Chan-ard T, Nabhitabhata J, Parr JWK (2015). A Field Guide to the Reptiles of Thailand. New York: Oxford University Press. 352 pp. .
Pauwels OSG, Bauer AM, Sumontha M, Chanhome L (2004). "Cyrtodactylus thirakhupti (Squamata: Gekkonidae), a new cave-dwelling gecko from southern Thailand". Zootaxa 772: 1–11.

Cyrtodactylus
Endemic fauna of Thailand
Geckos of Thailand
Reptiles described in 2004